Maxera bathyscia is a moth of the family Erebidae.

Distribution
It is found in Africa, where it is found in the Democratic Republic of the Congo and Uganda.

This species has a wingspan of 30 mm.

References

Erebidae
Moths described in 1961